Adrian Harold "Sparky" Maurer (April 7, 1901 – May 4, 1943) was an American football player.

Oglethorpe University
He played college football as a running back for the Oglethorpe Stormy Petrels football team of Oglethorpe University. He was inducted into the Oglethorpe University Athletic Hall of Fame in 1962.

1923
Maurer was selected second-team All-Southern by Julian Leggett of the Macon News, and first team All-Southern Intercollegiate Athletic Association (SIAA) by various writers including Morgan Blake.

1924
He was captain of the 1924 team which won the SIAA championship.

1925
The 1925 team was again SIAA champion.

Newark Bears
He played professionally with the Newark Bears.  The Bears are remembered for the team's financially weak ownership group, which led to the folding of the team mid-season.  The team played only five games before folding in October.

References

1901 births
1943 deaths
American football running backs
Oglethorpe Stormy Petrels football players
Newark Bears (AFL) players
Players of American football from Canton, Ohio